Physalaemus nanus is a species of frog in the family Leptodactylidae.
It is endemic to Brazil.
Its natural habitats are subtropical or tropical moist lowland forests, intermittent freshwater marshes, rural gardens, heavily degraded former forest, irrigated land, seasonally flooded agricultural land, and canals and ditches.
It is threatened by habitat loss.

References

nanus
Endemic fauna of Brazil
Taxonomy articles created by Polbot
Amphibians described in 1888